Surgery is a monthly peer-reviewed medical journal covering surgery. It was established in 1937 and is published by Elsevier. It is sponsored by the Society of University Surgeons, the Central Surgical Association, and the American Association of Endocrine Surgeons. The editors-in-chief are Steven D. Wexner (Cleveland Clinic Florida) and Kevin E. Behrns (Sant Louis University). According to the Journal Citation Reports, the journal has a 2019 impact factor of 3.356.

References

External links

Surgery journals
Publications established in 1937
Elsevier academic journals
English-language journals
Monthly journals